The 2008 United States Senate election in North Carolina was held on Tuesday, November 4, 2008. The Senate election coincided with the presidential, U.S. House elections, gubernatorial, Council of State, and statewide judicial elections. Incumbent Republican U.S. Senator Elizabeth Dole ran for re-election to a second term, but was defeated by Democrat Kay Hagan.

The November general election was the first time in North Carolina history, and only the eighth time in U.S. history, that the two major-party candidates for a U.S. Senate seat were both women. In addition, Hagan became the first Democrat to win this seat since 1966, and the first woman to defeat an incumbent woman in a U.S. Senate election. , this was the last time Democrats won a U.S. Senate election in North Carolina, and also the last time the winner of this seat received a majority of the vote.

Democratic primary

Candidates 
 Kay Hagan, State Senator
 Duskin Lassiter, trucker
 Jim Neal, businessman
 Howard Staley, doctor
 Marcus Williams, attorney

Campaign 
Hagan, initially an unknown politician, decided to challenge incumbent Republican Senator Elizabeth Dole.

National Democrats attempted to recruit incumbent Governor Mike Easley to make the race. A late October 2007 Rasmussen Report poll showed Easley defeating Dole 50% to 42%. Easley declined to run, as did Congressman Brad Miller, who expressed interest in early 2007. Former Governor Jim Hunt also declined to compete against Dole.

Neal earned the endorsement of the Black Political Caucus of Charlotte-Mecklenburg. He also was endorsed by Blue America PAC, eQualityGiving, the Independent Weekly and YES ! Weekly.

Results

Republican primary

Candidates 
 Elizabeth Dole, incumbent U.S. Senator
 Pete DiLauro

Results

General election

Candidates 
 Chris Cole (L), perennial candidate
 Elizabeth Dole (R), incumbent U.S. Senator
 Kay Hagan (D), State Senator

Campaign 

Dole was initially a heavy favorite for reelection, especially after several potential top-tier challengers such as Congressman Brad Miller, Governor Mike Easley and former Governor Jim Hunt all declined to compete against Dole. Ultimately, Kay Hagan, a state senator from Greensboro, won the Democratic primary election and became Dole's general election opponent.  Reports late in the campaign suggested that Dole, once considered a safe bet for reelection, suffered from Barack Obama's decision to aggressively contest North Carolina in the presidential election.

Hagan was initially given little chance against Dole, but Hagan was helped by independent 527 groups lobbying/advertising against incumbent Dole. The Democratic Senate Campaign Committee expended more money in North Carolina than in any other state during the 2008 election season. However, Dole benefited from more out-of-state funding overall than Hagan.  The efforts appeared to be effective, as Hagan began to take the lead in several polls beginning in September.

In late October, Dole released a controversial television ad attacking Hagan for reportedly taking donations from individuals involved in the Godless Americans PAC, a group which advocates for the rights of people who do not believe in God. The ad also included a female voice saying, "There is no God."  The Dole campaign said the ad correctly shows who Hagan will associate with in order to raise campaign funds, and on November 1, Bob Dole also defended it, asserting that "it never questions her faith," and that "the issue is why she was there.  There's no question about her faith.  I think it's [the ad's] fair game."

Hagan, who is a member of the Presbyterian Church and a former Sunday school teacher, condemned the ad as "fabricated and pathetic," and, according to Hagan's campaign website, a cease-and-desist letter was "hand-delivered to Dole's Raleigh office, faxed to her Salisbury office and sent to her home at the Watergate in Washington, DC." Hagan also filed a lawsuit in Wake County Superior Court accusing Dole of defamation and libel.

The ad has met exceptionally strong criticism from the public as well as many local and several national media outlets. CNN's Campbell Brown said about the ad: "[A]mid all the attack ads on the airwaves competing to out-ugly one another, we think we've found a winner." The ad has been described as "ridiculously outrageous," "indecent," a "gross misrepresentation," "worse than dishonest" and "beyond the bounds of acceptable political disagreement," among other harsh criticism. Another ad issued by the Dole campaign in mid-October 2008 was described by The Fayetteville Observer as "[setting] the low mark in negative political campaigning." The media reported, that within 48 hours of the first ad Hagan received over 3,600 contributions, including major donors as well as individual support from a range of atheists, agnostics and followers of other religious beliefs who felt they were being attacked by Dole. Following the second ad Hagan's lead doubled according to some polls.

Predictions

Polling 

Polls released during the week of October 28, 2008 showed Dole and Hagan within the statistical margin of error (3% apart).

Results

Analysis 
In the 2008 election, Dole lost by a wider-than-expected margin, taking only 44 percent of the vote to Hagan's 53 percent – the widest margin for a Senate race in North Carolina in 30 years, and the largest margin of defeat for an incumbent Senator in the 2008 cycle. It has been speculated that the outcry over the "Godless" ads contributed to Dole's loss. Hagan trounced Dole in the state's five largest counties – Mecklenburg, Wake, Guilford, Forsyth and Durham.  Hagan also dominated most of the eastern portion of the state, which had been the backbone of Helms' past Senate victories.  While Dole dominated the Charlotte suburbs and most of the heavily Republican Foothills region, it was not enough to save her seat.

See also 
 2008 United States Senate elections

References

External links 

 North Carolina State Board of Elections
 U.S. Congress candidates for North Carolina at Project Vote Smart
 North Carolina, U.S. Senate from CQ Politics
 North Carolina U.S. Senate from OurCampaigns.com
 Campaign contributions from OpenSecrets
 Dole vs Hagan graph of multiple polls from Pollster.com
 Official campaign websites (Archived)
 Elizabeth Dole, Republican nominee
 Kay Hagan, Democratic nominee
 Jim Neal, Democratic candidate

2008
North Carolina
United States Senate